Abiah W. Palmer (January 25, 1835 in Amenia, Dutchess County, New York – January 10, 1881 in Colorado Springs, El Paso County, Colorado) was an American politician from New York.

Life
He was the son of Capt. Abiah Palmer. He attended Amenia Seminary, and Oneida Conference Seminary in Cazenovia. Then he entered Union College, but due to ill health left in 1856 without graduating. He spent several months taking the "water cure" at Clifton Springs, and then travelled for two years about Europe. In 1859, he returned to his homestead in Amenia, and engaged in farming and the mining of iron ore. In 1864, he became the first President of the First National Bank of Amenia.

He was a member of the New York State Assembly (Dutchess Co., 1st D.) in 1860 and 1866. In 1866, Palmer was appointed by Gov. Reuben E. Fenton as Chairman of the Board of Commissioners in charge to select a site to establish the Hudson River State Hospital for the Insane. He was a member of the New York State Senate (11th D.) in 1868, 1869, 1872 and 1873.

In July 1870, he married Jeannette Yeamans (1851–1921), and they had two children. At the 1870 New York state election, he ran on the Republican ticket for New York State Comptroller, but was defeated by the incumbent Democrat Asher P. Nichols.

Afterwards, to improve his health, he went to live in Colorado Springs, where he died in 1881. He was buried at the Amenia Island Cemetery.

Sources
 The New York Civil List compiled by Franklin Benjamin Hough, Stephen C. Hutchins and Edgar Albert Werner (1870; pg. 444, 491 and 504)
 Life Sketches of the State Officers, Senators, and Members of the Assembly of the State of New York in 1868 by S. R. Harlow & S. C. Hutchins (pg. 130ff)
 OBITUARY NOTES; The Hon. Abiah W. Palmer... in NYT on January 14, 1881

External links

1835 births
1881 deaths
Republican Party New York (state) state senators
People from Amenia, New York
Politicians from Colorado Springs, Colorado
Republican Party members of the New York State Assembly
19th-century American politicians